Manteo is a town in Dare County, North Carolina, United States, located on Roanoke Island. The population was 1,602 at the 2020 census. It is the county seat of Dare County.

Geography
Manteo is located at  (35.904595, -75.669385), on the north central area of Roanoke Island. It is located off the exit at the South 16 mile post on US Hwy 158 at Whalebone Junction, the junction of NC Highways 158, 64, and 12, known as the Beach Road.

History
The town is named for an American Indian named Manteo, who was of the Croatans tribe of American Indians.  Manteo traveled with the English to London in 1584 where he and another Indian, Wanchese, learned to become the liaisons between the Roanoke Colony settlers and the Indians. He also had favorable interaction with British colonist John White. In fact, Manteo was christened and given the name Lord of Roanoke, making him the first American Indian to receive a title of nobility. Eventually, John White's daughter Eleanor married Ananias Dare, and they had the first American-born English child, Virginia Dare. In 1587, Manteo was friendly to White when he returned to find what the final stage of the Roanoke Colony became. When the colonists disappeared after supplies from England were delayed for three years, the ongoing mystery of "The Lost Colony" began.

The "Lost" colony was established by Richard Grenville, who brought back two Indians, one of them Manteo.  Manteo was named the seat of government for Dare County in 1870, and was incorporated in 1899.

Dare County is named for Virginia Dare.

In 1999, North Carolina public radio (NPR), WUNC, began broadcasting in Manteo as part of an effort to bring public radio to one of the largest areas on the East Coast of the United States without such service.

In 2005, Manteo restored its coastal warning display tower, and it is now operated by the Manteo branch of the North Carolina Maritime Museum.

Andy Griffith was a long-time resident of Manteo prior to his death in 2012.

The George Washington Creef House, John T. Daniels House, Fort Raleigh National Historic Site, and Theodore S. Meekins House are listed on the National Register of Historic Places.

Climate
Manteo has a humid subtropical climate (Cfa) like most of North Carolina with long, hot summers and short, cool winters. Precipitation is very heavy year round and falls on 96 days. Snow is a rare sight.

Demographics

2020 census

As of the 2020 United States census, there were 1,600 people, 865 households, and 491 families residing in the town.

2010 census
As of the census of 2010, there were 1,434 people, 681 households, and 373 families residing in the town. The population density was 843.5 people per square mile (318.7/km2˜). There were 1,353 housing units at an average density of 795.9 per square mile (300.7/km2˜). The racial makeup of the town was 84.7% White, 8.4% African American, 0.8% Native American, 0.3% Asian, 2.6% from other races, and 3% from two or more races. Hispanic or Latino of any race was 9% of the population.

There were 681 households, out of which 25.4% had children under the age of 18 living with them, 38.8% were married couples living together, 12.5% had a female householder with no husband present, and 45.2% were non-families. 39.1% of all households were made up of individuals, and 14.7% had someone living alone who was 65 years of age or older. The average household size was 2.11 and the average family size was 2.77.

In the town, the population was spread out, with 22.5% aged 19 or younger, 4.5% from 20 to 24, 25.6% from 25 to 44, 30.2% from 45 to 64, and 17.1% who were 65 years of age or older. The median age was 42.8 years. For every 100 females, there were 83.1 males. For every 100 females age 18 and over, there were 79.4 males.

The median income for a household in the town was $29,803, and the median income for a family was $40,625. The per capita income for the town was $23,803. About 26.5% of families and 32% of the population were below the poverty level, including 63.7% of those under age 18 and 12.6% of those age 65 or over.

Manteo is part of North Carolina's 3rd congressional district, represented by Republican Walt Jones, elected in 1994, until his death on February 10, 2019, where he was succeeded by Greg Murphy.

Twinning
The town claims it is twinned with Bideford, Devon in England. In October 2006 resident David Riley traveled to Bideford to mark the 20-year link between the two towns. Bideford town clerk George McLauchlan, told him locals had never heard of Manteo and the only town Bideford was twinned with was Landivisiau in France. Riley handed over a clock to celebrate the twenty-year link, while Manteo town manager Kermit Skinner said the link started in the 1980s during the 400th anniversary of Walter Raleigh’s voyages to America. As the story hit national news in the United Kingdom, further investigation revealed a link was established between the communities in 1981 when the mayor of Manteo, John Wilson, met with the mayor of Bideford, Pam Paddon, although it was recorded as friendly rather than formal twinning in Bideford. In April 2008, members of Bideford's town council visited Manteo in preparation to formalize the twinning in 2009.

Manteo has been twinned with Youghal, County Cork, Ireland since July 4, 2006.

Festivals and events
Dare Day — An annual celebration for the people of Dare County. The festival is free and open to all residents and visitors. There is a variety of entertainment, food, and shopping with all activities in walking distance. This festival is held on the first Saturday of June.

Independence Day — Every year on July 4 Manteo holds an Independence Day celebration. During the day there are an array of contests, games, and tournaments, and in the evening a fireworks display.

The New World Festival of the Arts — Held on the Manteo waterfront a great exhibition that features over 80 selected artists displaying and selling their work. It is a two-day outdoor art show that has been held for over 23 years running.

Pirate's Cove Billfish Tournament — This fishing tournament takes place annually in mid-August. Teams and boats come from around the world to participate. In the 2014 tournament, the boat with the highest cash prize was the Waste Knot (Captain Barry Sawyer) and angler of the winning fish (Denise LaCour). The team took home a cash prize of over $60,000.

Education
Dare County Schools is the area school district. The local schools are Manteo Elementary School, Manteo Middle School, and Manteo High School.

Dare County Library has a branch in Manteo.

Notable people
 George Ackles, professional basketball player
 Marc Basnight, served as a Democratic member of the North Carolina State Senate
 Emanuel Davis, defensive back in the Canadian Football League
 Andy Griffith, actor, comedian, television producer, Southern gospel singer, and writer
 Mabel Evans Jones, educator
 William Ivey Long, costume designer for stage and film

References

External links

 

Towns in Dare County, North Carolina
Towns in North Carolina
County seats in North Carolina
1685 establishments in North Carolina
Roanoke Island